Wamba is a Local Government Area in Nasarawa State, Nigeria. Its headquarters is in the town of Wamba.

It has an area of 1,156 km and a population of 72,894 at the 2006 census.

Attractions 

Wamba town is located close to the beautiful Farin Ruwa Falls. One of the highest waterfalls in Africa. The source of the waterfalls is the Jos plateau.

Postal Code
The postal code of the area is 960.

References

Local Government Areas in Nasarawa State